The Last edition of the J.League Cup, officially the 2006 J.League Yamazaki Nabisco Cup, sponsored by Nabisco began on March 29. Gamba Osaka were exempt from competing in the group stage, due to their entry into the Asian Champions League. They were therefore entered into the quarter-final stage.

The final was on November 3 at the Tokyo National Stadium. The winners were JEF United Ichihara Chiba, beating Kashima Antlers in the final 2-0 to claim its second J.League Cup championship.

Group stage

Group A

Group B

Group C

Group D

Runner-up qualifiers

Knockout stage

Quarter finals

First leg

Second leg

Kawasaki Frontale advances to the semi finals on Away goals rule.

Semi finals

First leg

Second leg

Kashima Antlers advances to the finals on Away goals rule.

Final

Awards
MVP :  Koki Mizuno (JEF United Chiba)
Top Scorer :  Washington (Urawa Red Diamonds), 9 goals
New Hero Prize :  Hiroyuki Taniguchi (Kawasaki Frontale)

See also
2006 J.League Division 1
2006 J.League Division 2
2006 Emperor's Cup

External links
 J.League Official Site 

2006 domestic association football cups
2006
LEa